The Schwenninger Wild Wings are a professional German ice hockey team from Schwenningen am Neckar in Baden-Wuerttemberg that was founded on 31 July 1904 and currently plays in the Deutsche Eishockey Liga (DEL). The greatest success of the association was to reach the play-off semi-finals of the first Bundesliga in 1990.  In 1994 the Wild Wings were a founding member of the Deutsche Eishockey Liga.

The Wild Wings play their home games in Helios Arena, a 6,193-seater stadium, and the club's colors are blue and white. The home club of the team is the Schwenningen ice and roller sports club 04 eV (german: Schwenninger Eis- und Rollsportclub 04 eV), which also competes in a junior and senior division and owns a figure skating and inline hockey department. Among the most famous players to have played at Schweninngen include the former captain of the German national ice hockey team Marcel Goc, the Seidenberg brothers, Dennis and Yannic, and former DEL record player Andreas Renz.

History
Schwenningen originally competed in the Deutsche Eishockey Liga (DEL) from 1994–95 until the 2002–03 season when they lost their license due to insolvency proceedings. From 2003 until 2013, they competed in the 2nd Bundesliga, where they were runner-up in the 2010, 2011 and 2013 seasons.

After 10 seasons in absentia from the DEL, the Wild Wings were returned to Germany's top league when they purchased the DEL license of the financially stricken Hannover Scorpions on 14 June 2013. They began competing from the 2013–14 season.

Season records

Players

Current roster

References

External links
Official website

 
Ice hockey teams in Germany
Ice hockey teams in Baden-Württemberg
1904 establishments in Germany
Ice hockey clubs established in 1904
Villingen-Schwenningen